The Nook, also known as the Francis Farquhar House, is a historic home located at Spring Garden Township, York County, Pennsylvania. It was designed by architect John A. Dempwolf and built between 1893 and 1898 for Francis Farquhar, son of Arthur B. Farquhar. It is a -story, Queen Anne / Shingle Style dwelling.  The exterior has a variety of finishes including brick, clapboard, wood shingles, and stucco.  The house features a polygonal turret, intersecting roofs of slate and shingle, and terra cotta ornamentation. Also on the property are a contributing small log playhouse and garage.

It was added to the National Register of Historic Places in 1982.

References

Houses on the National Register of Historic Places in Pennsylvania
Queen Anne architecture in Pennsylvania
Houses completed in 1898
Houses in York County, Pennsylvania
National Register of Historic Places in York County, Pennsylvania